Piotr Leszek Łukasiewicz (born 1974, in Warsaw) is a Polish diplomat, Colonel of the Polish Armed Forces, political scientist; ambassador to Afghanistan (2012–2014).

Life 
Łukasiewcz graduated from Military University of Technology, Faculty of Cybernetics. He has been studying also at the National Defence University of Warsaw and in Washington, D.C. In 2018, he defended his doctoral thesis International coalition’s state-building efforts in Afghanistan in the years 2001–2014.

Between 1995 and 2006 he served as a soldier, specializing in state security and counter-terrorism issues. He took part in military missions in Iraq. He was deputy military attaché in Pakistan (2006) and, since 2007, military attaché in Afghanistan. In October 2009, he became Plenipotentiary of the Minister of National Defence for the Polish Military Contingent in Afghanistan. On 31 January 2012 he ended his military career and retired.

On 12 June 2012, Łukasiewicz was nominated ambassador to Afghanistan, representing Poland during the most intensive time of the NATO mission in Afghanistan. He finished his term on 31 December 2014. He was the last Polish ambassador residing in Kabul.

Following his diplomatic career, he began working as an expert, university teacher, publicist.

In 2019, he was running in the 2019 European Parliament election as a candidate of Spring party.

Honours 

 Silver Cross of Merit (2009)
 Star of Iraq
 Honorary sabre of the Ministry of National Defence

References 

1972 births
Ambassadors of Poland to Afghanistan
Living people
People from Sosnowiec
Polish Army officers
Polish military attachés
Polish political scientists
Recipients of the Silver Cross of Merit (Poland)